Herpetogramma basalis is a species of moth in the family Crambidae. It is found on the Canary Islands and in Japan, China, Australia, Sri Lanka, India, Indonesia, La Réunion, South Africa, and Mali.

The wingspan is 20–22 mm. Adults are yellowish with fine black speckles on the wings.

The larvae feed on Amaranthus species, Lantana camara, beetroot, cucurbits and radish. Young larvae fold the leaves of their host plant to form a shelter from which they feed. Full-grown larvae move to the inflorescence, where pupation takes place within a cocoon. The larvae are white with green stripes.

References

Moths described in 1866
Herpetogramma
Moths of Réunion
Moths of Africa
Moths of Asia
Moths of Australia